Fritz C. Bedford (born 1963) is a competitive American swimmer who currently holds eight U.S. national records and has held seven world records.

College
Bedford attended St. Lawrence University where he was a nineteen time All-American.  This included all four years in both the 50-meter freestyle and 400-meter medley relay.  He qualified for the NCAA Championships as an individual all four years.  He was the New York state champion in the 50-meter freestyle and 200-meter backstroke as an individual and the 400 medley relay.  He was named Outstanding Male Senior Athlete in 1985 and inducted into the university's Hall of Fame in 2006.  While at St. Lawrence he joined Sigma Pi fraternity.  He earned his master's degree from the University of New Hampshire and his PhD from the University of Wisconsin.

Masters
Bedford began swimming in the Masters in 2009.

U.S. records held

World records held

SCM – Short Course Meters
SCY – Short Course Yards

Personal
Bedford works as a mechanical engineer and is the brother of Olympian BJ Bedford.

References

American male backstroke swimmers
American male butterfly swimmers
American male freestyle swimmers
Masters swimmers
St. Lawrence Saints athletes
University of New Hampshire alumni
1963 births
Living people
20th-century American people
21st-century American people